Darren Barnett (born May 22, 1984 - July 1, 2021) is a former American football cornerback. He was originally signed by the Giants as an undrafted free agent in 2007. He played college football at Missouri State.

Early years
Barnett graduated from Princeton High School in 2003.

Barnett committed to Michigan State University on July 8, 2003.

References

External links
New York Giants bio

1984 births
Living people
Players of American football from Cincinnati
American football cornerbacks
Missouri State Bears football players
New York Giants players
Cincinnati Commandos players
Odessa Roughnecks players